Ekmaniopappus is a genus of flowering plants in the daisy family.

Species
There is only one known species, Ekmaniopappus mikanioides, native to the island of Hispaniola in the West Indies (Haiti and Dominican Republic).

References

Senecioneae
Flora of the Dominican Republic
Monotypic Asteraceae genera